Hugh Darwen is a computer scientist who was an employee of IBM United Kingdom from 1967 to 2004, and has been involved in the development of the relational model.

Work 
From 1978 to 1982 he was a chief architect on Business System 12, a database management system that faithfully embraced the principles of the relational model. He worked closely with Christopher J. Date and represented IBM at the ISO SQL committees (JTC1 SC32 WG3 Database languages, WG4 SQL/MM) until his retirement from IBM. Darwen is the author of The Askew Wall and co-author of The Third Manifesto, a proposal for serving object-oriented programs with purely relational databases without compromising either side and getting the best of both worlds, arguably even better than with so-called object-oriented databases.

From 2004 to 2013 he lectured on relational databases at the Department of Computer Science, University of Warwick (UK), and from 1989 to 2014 was a tutor and consultant for the Open University (UK) where he was awarded a MUniv honorary degree for academic and scholarly distinction. He was also awarded a DTech (Doctor in Technology) honorary degree by the University of Wolverhampton. He later taught a database language designed by Chris Date and himself called Tutorial D.

Bridge 
Alan Truscott has called him "the world's leading authority" on composed bridge problems. He was responsible for the double dummy column in Bridge Magazine and other UK bridge publications from 1965 to 2004.

Publications 
His early works were published under the pseudonym of Andrew Warden: both names are anagrams of his surname.
 , 213 pp.  
 , 331 pp.  
 .
 , 231 pp.
 , 169 pp.
 
 , 67 pp.
 , 496 pp.

, 547 pp.

, 422 pp.

, 572 pp.
, 548 pp.

References

External links
  at University of Warwick
 Double Dummy Corner – Darwen's website devoted to problems in the play of the cards at bridge 
 The Third Manifesto (Date & Darwen 1995) – with material related to the book and links to Darwen's seminar and lecture slides
 
 Andrew Warden at LC Authorities with 1 catalogue record (1990 collection)

1943 births
Living people
IBM employees
Academics of the University of Warwick
Contract bridge writers
Place of birth missing (living people)